Between Frames: The Art of Brazilian Animation — released in Brazil as Luz, Anima, Ação — is a 2013 Brazilian documentary film directed and written by Eduardo Calvet. The film recalls the memory of almost 100 years of history of Brazilian animation, revealing the main personalities who helped to build this trajectory and remembering landmarks and creations of all times from films, TV and advertising.

Synopsis
The film makes an overview of animation in Brazil, since the first animation created in 1917, called The Kaiser, until the success of the animation film series Ice Age and Rio, each directed by Carlos Saldanha. Besides him, other big names were also heard, like Maurício de Souza, Otto Guerra and Chico Liberato, who report their experiences on the market and give a current panorama of Brazilian production.

Cast

Alê Abreu as himself
Diego Akel as himself
Guilherme Alvernaz as himself
Alceu Baptistão as himself
Telmo Carvalho as himself
Celia Catunda as herself
César Coelho as himself
Maurício de Sousa as himself
Marcelo Fabri Marão as himself
Arnaldo Galvão as himself
Otto Guerra as himself
Pedro Iuá as himself
Paulo José as himself
Olívia Latini as herself
Chico Liberato as himself
Andres Lieban as himself
Marcos Magalhães as himself
Roberto Maia as himself
Daniel Messias as himself
Kiko Mistrorigo as himself
Antônio Moreno as himself
Paulo Munhoz as himself
Itsuo Nakashima as himself
José Mario Parrot as himself
Aída Queiroz as herself
Walbercy Ribas as himself
Quia Rodrígues as himself
Rosaria as herself
Carlos Saldanha as himself
Allan Sieber as himself
Maurício Squarisi as himself
Pedro Stilpen as himself
Ennio Torresan as himself
Rosana Urbes as herself
Fabio Yamaji as himself

See also
List of Brazilian animated films

References

External links 
 
 Trailer

Brazilian documentary films
2013 documentary films
2013 films
Documentary films about animation
2010s Portuguese-language films